Cécile Jeanson (born 17 August 1972) is a French former swimmer who competed in the 1992 Summer Olympics, in the 1996 Summer Olympics, and in the 2000 Summer Olympics.

References

1972 births
Living people
French female butterfly swimmers
Olympic swimmers of France
Swimmers at the 1992 Summer Olympics
Swimmers at the 1996 Summer Olympics
Swimmers at the 2000 Summer Olympics
European Aquatics Championships medalists in swimming
Mediterranean Games gold medalists for France
Mediterranean Games medalists in swimming
Swimmers at the 1991 Mediterranean Games
20th-century French women
21st-century French women